Heleen is a Dutch version of the feminine given name Helena. People with the name include:

Heleen Aafje Boering (born 1964), Dutch water polo goalkeeper
 (born 1965), Dutch chess master
Heleen Hage (born 1958), Dutch road racing cyclist
Heleen Jaques (born 1988), Belgian footballer
Heleen Mees (born 1968), Dutch opinion writer, economist, and lawyer
Heleen Peerenboom (born 1980), Dutch water polo player
Heleen van Royen (born 1958), Dutch novelist and columnist
Heleen Sancisi Weerdenburg (1944–2000), Dutch ancient historian
 (born 1974), Dutch triathlete

Dutch feminine given names